The Sterrett Sub-District School in the Point Breeze neighborhood of Pittsburgh, Pennsylvania, is a building from 1898. It was listed on the National Register of Historic Places in 1986.

References

School buildings on the National Register of Historic Places in Pennsylvania
School buildings completed in 1898
Schools in Pittsburgh
Pittsburgh History & Landmarks Foundation Historic Landmarks
City of Pittsburgh historic designations
National Register of Historic Places in Pittsburgh